Jean-Baptiste Vivien de Châteaubrun (1686 – 16 February 1775) was a French dramatist and a member of the Académie française. He was born and died in Angoulême.

He spent 40 years of his life polishing two plays, but his maid mistook them for wrapping paper, thus losing his life's work. Today, his work Les Troyennes (1734) survives.

Bibliography
 Mahomet second, tragédie (1714)
 Les Troyennes, tragédie (1751)
 Philoctète, tragédie (1755)
 Astyanax, tragédie (1756)
 Шатобрэн, Жан-Батист-Вивьен

1686 births
1775 deaths
People from Angoulême
18th-century French dramatists and playwrights
Members of the Académie Française